Mitromorpha maraisi is a species of sea snail, a marine gastropod mollusk in the family Mitromorphidae.

Description
The length of the shell attains 4.1 mm.

Distribution
This marine species occurs off East Transkei and KwaZulu-Natal, South Africa.

References

 Kilburn R.N. (1986). Turridae (Mollusca: Gastropoda) of southern Africa and Mozambique. Part 3. Subfamily Borsoniinae. Annals of the Natal Museum. 27: 633–720

External links
 
 Worldwide Mollusc Species Data Base: Mitromorpha maraisi

Endemic fauna of South Africa
maraisi
Gastropods described in 1986